"Don't Let Her Be Gone" is a song recorded by Canadian country music artist Gord Bamford. It was released in September 2015 as the first single from his seventh studio album, Tin Roof. It peaked at number 3 on the Billboard Canada Country chart.

Music video
The music video was directed by Stephano Barberis and premiered in September 2015.

Chart performance

References

2015 songs
2015 singles
Gord Bamford songs
Sony Music singles
Music videos directed by Stephano Barberis